The 2016 Rajyotsava Awards ceremony took place at the Ravindra Kalakshetra on 1 November 2016. Awarded annually by the government of Karnataka, the ceremony saw 61 individuals being awarded for achievements in various fields. The number was chosen to mark the 61st anniversary of the formation of the State of Karnataka.

List of awardees
The selection committee adhered to the yardstick of minimum age of 60 while selecting individuals for the awards. However, norms were relaxed in the field of sports and social sector.

Winners:

Individual

Organisations/Associations

References

Rajyotsava Award
Recipients of the Rajyotsava Award 2016